Myint Myint Aye (born 27 December 1988) is a Burmese footballer who plays as a defender. She has been a member of the Myanmar women's national team.

International career
Myint Myint Aye represented Myanmar at the 2007 AFC U-19 Women's Championship. She capped at senior level during the 2014 AFC Women's Asian Cup qualification.

International goals

References

1988 births
Living people
Women's association football defenders
Burmese women's footballers
People from Ayeyarwady Region
Myanmar women's international footballers